Being Emily is a 2012 novel. It is the first young adult novel to tell the story of a transgender girl from her perspective. In the story, Emily (born Christopher) begins to come out during her junior year of high school, first to her girlfriend Claire and then, with the help of an understanding therapist, to her family.

Kate Bornstein described it as: "Powerful and empowering, with an optimistic message that we all need more of in our lives." Lydia Harris describes the novel as "extraordinarily poignant" and says that "the chapters chronicling [Emily's friend] Claire's struggles with religious, emotional and social mores are worth the price of this novel alone."

See also
Transgender and transsexual fiction

References

2010s LGBT novels
2012 American novels
LGBT-related young adult novels
Novels with transgender themes
American young adult novels
American LGBT novels
Lesbian teen fiction
2012 LGBT-related literary works